Bank First, formerly known as Victoria Teachers Mutual Bank, is an Australian financial institution based in the state of Victoria.

As a mutual bank, Bank First is owned by its customers and not external shareholders. Each of its over 110,000 customers owns an equal share of the organization.

The bank was renamed Bank First from Victoria Teachers Mutual Bank in December 2017.

References

External links

 Bank First

Banks established in 1972
Banks of Australia
1972 establishments in Australia
Companies based in Melbourne